The Seaver/National Endowment for the Arts Conductors Award was an award for conductors in the United States.

History
The award was established in 1985 as the Affiliate Artists' Seaver Conducting Award. The award was being given every two or three years. The award was conceived by the Seaver Institute and funded by the Seaver Institute and the National Endowment for the Arts. From 1987 to 1993 it was administered by the New World Symphony of Miami. It was then administered by the Juilliard School.

Award winners
 Hugh Wolff and Kent Nagano, 1985
 Catherine Comet, Jahja Ling, and Neal Stulberg, 1988
 Kenneth Jean and Carl St. Clair, 1990
 David Loebel and Christopher Wilkins, 1992
 Robert Spano, 1994
 Alan Gilbert and David Robertson, 1997
 William Eddins, 2000
 JoAnn Falletta and Miguel Harth-Bedoya, 2002

References

American music awards